Gojen Gadi is an Indian politician from the state of Arunachal Pradesh.

Gadi was elected from Basar seat in the 2014 Arunachal Pradesh Legislative Assembly election, standing as a People's Party of Arunachal candidate. he lost the 2019 MLA election to Mr Gokar basar of NPP

See also
Arunachal Pradesh Legislative Assembly

References

External links
Profile
Gojen Gadi Janta Pratinidhi profile
MyNeta Profile

People's Party of Arunachal politicians
Indian National Congress politicians
Living people
Arunachal Pradesh MLAs 2014–2019
Year of birth missing (living people)